The Tahrir Institute for Middle East Policy (TIMEP) is a nonpartisan, nonprofit organization dedicated to raising awareness of democratic transitions in the Middle East through analysis, advocacy, and action.

Mission
TIMEP’s mission, through its research and advocacy, is to uncover and support initiatives and voices—wherever they may be—that call for the following in the Middle East:
• Restoration and primacy of the rule of law; equality of all citizens before the law; access to fair and swift justice; respect for human rights, including freedom of expression and of religion; protection of civil and political liberties; expansion of women’s rights; youth empowerment; freedom of the media; balancing power within governments; and elections for public office that are free, fair, and contested openly in an environment of political pluralism.

• Adoption of economic policies that responsibly harness and develop, rather than stifle or waste, the region’s human, natural and capital resources.

Projects

Legislation Tracker
TIMEP's Legislation Tracker offers a comprehensive database of the decrees and laws passed under sole presidential authority, presented in an interactive timeline format. All laws and decrees are also topically cataloged with commentary on the constitutional context in which such legislation exists.

Egypt Security Watch
The Egypt Security Watch project offers original content on the security situation in Egypt as a whole. The project components consist of:
 Interactive Map: The live map component of the website showcases both instances of terror attacks and counter-terror efforts from 2010 to the current day.
 Infographics: This section features graphics and charts to document trends and developments.
 Analysis: This section features the work of experts looking into the development of security threats, the efficacy and implications of counter-terror efforts, and offer prognosis for the medium- and long-term.
 Profiles: This section offers profiles of terrorist groups, their leaders and ideology, as well as those that hold positions of authority in state institutions tasked with combating terrorism.

Elections Monitoring
TIMEP's Elections Monitoring portal provided daily assessments of campaign developments leading up to the Egyptian presidential election in 2014 and timely information on the days of the elections. Following the elections, analyses of the election process and what the results of the election bode for Egypt’s next president was presented.

Scholar Spotlight
A series of videos and podcasts featuring prominent scholars whose work has international policy implications and presenting their views on how to better use research to inform actionable policy.

Eshhad
Eshhad is an online platform that aggregates and collates alleged religious persecution and sectarian attacks in Egypt. Although Egypt’s Christians have been the predominant target of sectarian hostility, the country’s Bahá’í, Jewish, Shi’a, and Non-Religious citizens have also been subject to similar incidents of discrimination. Eshhad hosts a database that collects publicly available information and a map that geo-references the recorded incidents. In addition to the Eshhad Database and Eshhad Map, Eshhad will provide a variety of resources, including minority group background profiles and analytical commentary. Sectarianism is a complex issue and with the increasing political and social changes the need for a way to track the problem is of growing importance. Although currently focused on minorities in Egypt, future phases of the project may expand to include other coverage of other countries and marginalized groups in the Middle East and North Africa.

Transitional Justice Project
TIMEP’s Transitional Justice Project (TJP) is an innovative, timely project that addresses crucial issues at the heart of the transitions in the Middle East and fills an important knowledge gap on these issues. The project, founded by Non-Resident Fellow Mai El-Sadany and supported by TIMEP staff, enables a much-needed dialogue on the definition and role of transitional justice in the countries of the Arab world, the potential shapes that such transitional justice policies may take, the mechanisms of transitional justice that have already been attempted in the region, and the capacity and willingness of the society, state, and international community to see transitional justice policies through to their fruition.

The Bassem Sabry Democracy Fellowship
The Bassem Sabry Democracy Fellowship was established on May 2, 2014, in memory of Egyptian political writer and commentator Bassem Sabry.

Offered in partnership with Atlas Corps, a leader in international exchange fellowships, this fellowship is open to youth from the Middle East or North Africa in the fields of journalism, international relations, political science, or other relevant fields, and aims to further the causes and principles Sabry believed in.

Board of Advisors
 Ziad Asali, President and founder of the American Task Force on Palestine
 Graeme Bannerman, founder of Bannerman Associates
 Larry Diamond, senior fellow, Hoover Institution and Freeman Spogli Institute for International Studies
 Adam Ereli,  Vice Chairman of Mercury’s Washington.
 Francis Fukuyama, professor at Stanford University.
 Sultan Al Qassemi, commentator on Arab Affairs.
 Nagla Rizk, Professor of Economics, American University in Cairo
 Marietje Schaake, Member of the European Parliament with the Alliance of Liberals and Democrats for Europe Party (ALDE).
 Ghada Shahbender, founding member of Shayfeencom.
 Alex Shalaby, Chairman of the Egyptian Company for Mobile Services (Mobinil).

References

501(c)(3) organizations
Middle Eastern studies in the United States
Organizations based in Washington, D.C.